Bądkówek  is a village in the administrative district of Gmina Bądkowo, within Aleksandrów County, Kuyavian-Pomeranian Voivodeship, in North-Central Poland.

References

Villages in Aleksandrów County